Ledbetter is a census-designated place (CDP) in Livingston County, Kentucky, United States. The population was 1,683 at the 2010 census, down slightly from 1,700 in 2000, thus making it the most populous community in the county. It is part of the Paducah, KY-IL Micropolitan Statistical Area, laying directly across the Tennessee River from Paducah.

Geography
Ledbetter is located at  (37.048501, -88.498251).

Demographics

As of the census of 2000, there were 1,700 people, 681 households, and 493 families residing in the CDP. The racial makeup of the CDP was 99.06% White, 0.29% African American, 0.24% Native American or Alaska Native, 0.12% Asian, and 0.29% from two or more races. Hispanics or Latinos of any race were 0.53% of the population.

There were 681 households, out of which 32.3% had children under the age of 18 living with them, 57.4% were married couples living together, 10.6% had a female householder with no husband present, and 27.5% were non-families. 22.6% of all households were made up of individuals, and 6.8% had someone living alone who was 65 years of age or older. The average household size was 2.50 and the average family size was 2.90.

The age distribution was 23.8% under the age of 18, 9.1% from 18 to 24, 30.0% from 25 to 44, 27.5% from 45 to 64, and 9.5% who were 65 years of age or older. The median age was 37 years. For every 100 females, there were 100.9 males. For every 100 females age 18 and over, there were 98.0 males.

The median income for a household in the CDP was $34,830, and the median income for a family was $40,217. Males had a median income of $33,080 versus $18,224 for females. The per capita income for the CDP was $16,196. About 7.7% of families and 7.7% of the population were below the poverty line, including 8.2% of those under age 18 and 7.4% of those age 65 or over.

References

Census-designated places in Livingston County, Kentucky
Kentucky populated places on the Ohio River
Kentucky populated places on the Tennessee River
Census-designated places in Kentucky